Nnanna Ikpo is a Nigerian writer. He is most noted for his 2017 novel Fimí Sílẹ̀ Forever, which was a shortlisted Lambda Literary Award finalist for Gay Fiction at the 30th Lambda Literary Awards in 2018.

References

21st-century Nigerian novelists
Nigerian male novelists
Nigerian LGBT novelists
Gay novelists
Living people
21st-century male writers
Year of birth missing (living people)